Fantomerna (lit. The Phantoms) is the third novel by Swedish author Klas Östergren. It was published in 1978.

References

External links

1978 Swedish novels
Novels by Klas Östergren
Swedish-language novels
Novels set in Stockholm
Albert Bonniers Förlag books